Sepia foliopeza is a species of cuttlefish native to the western Pacific Ocean, specifically the East China Sea and Taiwan. The depth range of S. foliopeza is unknown.

Sepia foliopeza grows to a mantle length of 110 mm.

The type specimen was collected in the East China Sea. It is deposited at the National Science Museum of Japan in Tokyo.

References

External links

Cuttlefish
Molluscs described in 1987